Gundemonium Collection is a set of three shoot'em ups created by indie developer Platine Dispositif. English language versions were released on Steam and the PlayStation Network by publisher Rockin' Android on August 4, 2010. Destructoid explains "All the games have Trophies to collect and include a feature that allows uploading your play sessions to YouTube." According to Metro, "There is a back story that links all three games".

Individual games

Hitogata Happa

Metro said "The final game is a vertically-scrolling shooter, one that chooses to ignore the lessons learned from GundeadliGne and is in fact the hardest of the bunch. The sadistic streak is a shame, because in many ways it's the most inventive of the lot with a number of different playable characters with different abilities."

GundeadliGne

The NSFW second game in the series, although the English localizations offer limited censorship.

Metro explains "The middle game in the trilogy is also a horizontal shooter and probably the best of the three, not least because it's the only one with a two-player co-operative mode. The basics are the same as the first game, but you can now flip your character to face both left and right...The real reason this is the best of the bunch though is simply that it's a lot easier."

Gundemonium Recollection

A "horizontally scrolling shooter", Metro explains "This is the newest of the three games, but as the name suggests it's a remake of the original Gundemonium title from 2003." The site explains "the game is punishingly hard in a way that even we've barely experienced before. The quite wrongly named novice mode is enough to send most gamers screaming from the room and that's just on the first level". In December 2017 Plastine announced a new game called Gundemoniums which will be based on the 2003-released PC game Gundemonium and the 2007-released remake Gundemonium Recollection. The official website describe Gundemonium as "A rebuilt version of the side-scrolling shoot 'em' up.

Reception 

Metro summed up its review of the collection by saying "They don't call it bullet hell for nothing and although these three games are all good examples of the genre the high difficulty level will prove far too much for the uninitiated. Pros: The action is well orchestrated, with attractive visuals. Excellent value for money and an impressive range of PlayStation 3 specific options. Cons: Frustratingly hard on a scale even hardened veterans of the genre will be unprepared for. Gundemonium and GundeadliGne are visually almost identical", rating it a 7/10. PSN Stores liked the "frenzied "bullet hell" shmup action", constant framerate, easy snapshot, YouTube functionality, and multiple gameplay modes. The site disliked the confusing HUD and hit detection, the fact that only one of the titles had 2 player co-op, and that "some of the modes are ludicrously difficult".

References

External links
 Official website

2010 video games
Indie video games
Shoot 'em ups
Scrolling shooters
PlayStation 3 games
PlayStation Network games
Video games developed in Japan
Video games featuring female protagonists
Windows games